The Mad Dash, or Slaughter's Mad Dash, refers to an event in the eighth inning of the seventh game of the 1946 World Series between the St. Louis Cardinals and the Boston Red Sox.

Background

Personnel involved

Context
The 1946 Boston Red Sox ran away with the American League crown by twelve games over the Detroit Tigers with a 104–50 record, and were heavy favorites in the World Series against the St. Louis Cardinals. They led the series three games to two as it headed back to Sportsman's Park in St. Louis for Game 6. The Cardinals won that game on sensational defense and a brilliant pitching performance by Harry Brecheen to bring the series to a deciding seventh game.

Game 7 was played in Sportsman's Park on October 15, 1946. After Red Sox center fielder Dom DiMaggio drove in two runs in the top of the eighth, the score was tied 3–3. DiMaggio pulled a hamstring during the play and was forced to leave the game; he was replaced by a pinch runner, Leon Culberson, who also replaced DiMaggio in center field in the bottom of the inning.

Cardinal right fielder Enos Slaughter led off with a single off of pitcher Bob Klinger.  After a failed bunt attempt by Whitey Kurowski and a flyout to left field by Del Rice, Slaughter found himself still on first base with two outs.  Left fielder Harry Walker stepped to the plate and, after the count reached two balls and one strike, Cardinals manager Eddie Dyer called for a hit-and-run.

The play

With Slaughter running, Walker lined the ball to left-center field, where Culberson fielded the ball. As he threw a relay to shortstop Johnny Pesky, Slaughter rounded third base, ignored third base coach Mike González's stop sign, and continued for home.

What exactly happened when Pesky turned around is still a matter of contention. Some claim that Pesky, assuming that Slaughter would not be running home, checked Walker at first base instead of immediately firing home, while others contend that Pesky was so shocked to see Slaughter on his way to score that he had a mental lapse that accounted for the delay. Whatever the reason, the delay, along with a weak and rushed throw home, allowed Slaughter to score just as Red Sox catcher Roy Partee caught it up the line from home plate.

Official scoring
Walker's hit was scored as a double, but could have been scored a single with him advancing to second on Pesky's throw home.

Aftermath
The run put the Cardinals ahead 4–3 and proved to be the winning run of the decisive seventh game.  In Boston, "Pesky held the ball" became a catchphrase, although a soft throw from Culberson (playing in place of the strong-armed DiMaggio) may have been more to blame. In St. Louis, a statue depicting Slaughter sliding across home plate at the end of the play stands outside the current ballpark. This play was named #10 on the Sporting News list of Baseball's 25 Greatest Moments in 1999.

See also
Curse of the Bambino

References

External links
YouTube: Enos Slaughter's Mad Dash.MOV

1946 Major League Baseball season
Boston Red Sox postseason
St. Louis Cardinals postseason
World Series games
October 1946 sports events in the United States
1946 in sports in Missouri
Historic baseball plays
Baseball competitions in St. Louis